Deskie Castle was a medieval tower house that is thought to have been near Bridgend of Livet, Moray, Scotland.

History
Little is known of the castle apart from a traditional rhyme:

Structure
An irregularly oval knoll which is scarped and somewhat levelled is locally known as 'Deskie Castle'. There are traces of walling around the edges to the west and north. There is evidence of another  wall crossing the summit. It is all on a boggy slope which faces south-west, while a natural escarpment overlooks on the north and east. But it is not clear that the banks formed a continuous outer defence to the mound. While the earthworks are not of motte and bailey type, it is thought possible in view of the traditions associated with the site that they are the remains of a medieval stronghold.
It is a scheduled monument.

See also
Castles in Great Britain and Ireland
List of castles in Scotland

References	

Castles in Moray
Scheduled monuments in Scotland